Tequan Richmond (born October 30, 1992), also known as T-Rich, is an American actor best known for playing Drew Rock on the UPN/CW sitcom Everybody Hates Chris. Richmond played Ray Charles Jr. (son of singer and musician Ray Charles) in the motion picture Ray, and in the soap opera General Hospital on ABC, he portrayed TJ Ashford.

Career
In 2001, Richmond moved to Los Angeles, California, not intending to become an actor. He appeared in magazine ads such as Sports Illustrated, Reader's Digest, Newsweek, and National Geographic, as well as a national Nestlé print ad. Richmond made his 2013 Sundance Film Festival debut with a performance as Beltway sniper Lee Boyd Malvo in "Blue Caprice." The film sold to Sundance Select/IFC Films and opened New Directors/New Films Festival at MoMA in 2013. The film had a fall 2013 theater release.

Richmond also was one of six hosts for children's TV shows on Toon Disney and has had guest starring roles on CBS's Cold Case, CSI: Crime Scene Investigation, Private Practice, Detroit 1-8-7, Memphis Beat, Love That Girl and Numb3rs as well as Lifetime's Strong Medicine and FX's The Shield. He has co-starred on NBC's ER, Showtime's Weeds, and Fox's MADtv.

While starring on Everybody Hates Chris, in 2008, Richmond appeared on the Tide brand commercial with a voice-over by MC Lyte.

Richmond appeared in the music video "Hate It Or Love It" as young Game by rappers 50 Cent and the Game.

Filmography

Television

Film

Awards and nominations

Notes

References

 "Everybody Loves Tequan", Listen Magazine
 "Everybody Hates Chris: CW Sitcom Cancelled, No Season Five", TV Series Finale.com, 21 May 2009
 "T-Rich (Actor From TV Show Everybody Hates Chris)", WorldStarHipHop.com, 17 December 2009
 Tequan Richmond at Fandango: All Movie Guide
 Tequan Richmond at Online Video Guide
 Lopez, Robert. "Everybody Loves Tequan", Greensboro News & Record, 24 October 2008
 Sneider, Jeff. Sundance:  Tequan Richmond Shifts Gears in "Blue Caprice", "Variety", 19 January 2013
 Blue Caprice:  Official Selection 2013 Sundance Film Festival, SimonSays Entertainment, Inc. 25 February 2013

External links
 
 Tequan Richmond Official YouTube Channel at YouTube

1992 births
Living people
21st-century American male actors
21st-century American rappers
African-American male actors
African-American male rappers
American male child actors
American male film actors
American male rappers
American male soap opera actors
American male television actors
Capitol Records artists
Def Jam Recordings artists
Male actors from North Carolina
Musicians from North Carolina
People from Burlington, North Carolina
Rappers from North Carolina